Pataveh-ye Charusa (also Romanized as Pātāveh-ye Chārūsā; also known as Pātāveh-ye ‘Olyā) is a village in Tayebi-ye Sarhadi-ye Sharqi Rural District, Charusa District, Kohgiluyeh County, Kohgiluyeh and Boyer-Ahmad Province, Iran. At the 2006 census, its population was 325, in 60 families.

References 

Populated places in Kohgiluyeh County